Live at the Royal Albert Hall is the second live album and video by British rock band Bring Me the Horizon. It was recorded on 22 April 2016 at the Royal Albert Hall, with accompaniment from the Parallax Orchestra conducted by Simon Dobson. The album was released on 2 December 2016 through the crowdfunding platform PledgeMusic, with all proceeds being donated to Teenage Cancer Trust.

Concert and response
On 26 November 2015, it was announced that Bring Me the Horizon would be performing at the Teenage Cancer Trust concerts at the Royal Albert Hall in London on 22 April 2016, being accompanied for the first time by a full live orchestra and choir. Tickets for the show went on sale on 4 December 2015. American rock band PVRIS performed as the opening act. Bring Me the Horizon performed alongside Parallax Orchestra conducted by Simon Dobson, and gave live debuts for That's the Spirit tracks "Avalanche" and "Oh No", as well as performing "It Never Ends" and "Empire (Let Them Sing)" (from There Is a Hell... and Sempiternal, respectively) for the first time since 2014.

Response to the concert was widely positive. Writing for The Independent, Steve Anderson awarded it four out of five stars, praising the performances of both the band's recent, more subtle material and their earlier, heavier songs. Similarly, Tomas Doyle of Rock Sound hailed the show as "a special, special night", highlighting "It Never Ends" as the best song. Metal Injection's Greg Kennelty proclaimed that "Like 'em or not, Bring Me the Horizon performed a fantastic set". Following the success of the show, Fish hinted at the possibility of completing a full tour with an orchestra, noting that "It seems almost a bit of a shame to go to all this effort for months and months for just one night".

Promotion and release
In March 2016, it was announced that the show would be recorded and later released as a live video album, with all proceeds from the release going to Teenage Cancer Trust. After being initially slated for a 1 September 2016 release, the album was issued on 2 December 2016 on double CD, triple LP, double DVD, Blu-ray and digital download.

Track listing

Personnel
Bring Me the Horizon

 Oliver Sykes – lead vocals
 Jordan Fish – keyboards, programming, percussion, backing vocals
 Lee Malia – lead guitar
 Matt Kean – bass
 Matt Nicholls – drums, drum machine

Additional musicians

References

2016 live albums
Bring Me the Horizon albums
Live albums recorded at the Royal Albert Hall